Logic games, abbreviated LG, and officially referred to as analytical reasoning, is one of three types of sections that appear on the Law School Admission Test (LSAT). A logic games section contains four 5-8 question "games", totaling 22-25 questions. Each game contains a scenario and a set of rules that govern the scenario, followed by questions that test the test-taker's ability to understand and apply the rules, to draw inferences based on them. In the words of the  Law School Admission Council (LSAC), which administers the test, it "measure[s] the ability to understand a structure of relationships and to draw logical conclusions about that structure". Like all other sections on the LSAT, the time allowed for this section is 35 minutes. While most students find this section to be the most difficult section on the LSAT, it is widely considered the easiest and fastest to improve at once the right strategies are learned and employed.

Common game types

Basic linear 
In a basic linear game, two sets of variables are provided. The first set of variables, sometimes referred to as the 'base variables,' is often days of the week, an order of arrival, or some other order. The second variable set is then matched to the first set according to a set of rule. For example:

After setting the scenario, the game challenges the test-taker with questions such as:

Advanced linear 
Advanced linear games are similar to basic linear games, but three or more sets of variables are presented. For example:

The game can then provide rules and pose questions relating to the order of arrival of a runner, the color of a specific runner's shirt, sequences of color that must or must not be present, the shirt color of the runner that comes first etc.

Grouping 
Grouping games provide variables that must be assigned to groups, but not in a specific order or sequence. For example:

Grouping linear combinations 
Combination games follow a similar structure but include both linear and grouping elements.

Less common game types 
In addition to the common games, the LSAT sometimes includes other types of games that appear less frequently. Examples of less common games are:
 Mapping – Distribution of marks or landmarks on a map.   
 Pure sequencing – A variation on the basic linear games, but no placement rules are given, only sequencing rules.
 Circular linearity – Similar to linear games, but the variables are placed in a circle rather than a straight line, thus allowing spatial relationships in addition to the neighboring relationships.
 Pattern – A variation on the advanced linear games, but no placement rules are given, only pattern rules.

Method 
To solve the game quickly and efficiently, test-takers usually draw a master diagram at the bottom of the page. The rules and key inferences are written down in short symbols next to the diagram, and, where possible, marked on the diagram itself. A smaller diagram can also be drawn next to a specific question if that question poses any additional rules. On some games, it is helpful to create separate diagrams of all the possibilities and then use that to tackle the questions.

See also
Puzzle
Process of elimination

References

External links
http://www.lsac.org/jd
http://www.lsac.org/jd/lsat/prep/analytical-reasoning

Legal profession exams
Standardized tests
Legal education in the United States
Logic
Puzzles